Nestos is a municipality in the Kavala regional unit, East Macedonia and Thrace, Greece. The seat of the municipality is the town Chrysoupoli. The municipality has an area of 678.831 km2. It was named after the river Nestos.

Municipality
The municipality Nestos was formed at the 2011 local government reform by the merger of the following 3 former municipalities, that became municipal units:
 Chrysoupoli
 Keramoti
 Oreino

Province
The province of Nestos was one of the provinces of the Kavala Prefecture. It had the same territory as the present municipality. It was abolished in 2006.

References

Municipalities of Eastern Macedonia and Thrace
Populated places in Kavala (regional unit)
Provinces of Greece